Ivan Dimitrov (born 21 January 1952) is a Bulgarian volleyball player. He competed in the men's tournament at the 1972 Summer Olympics.

References

1952 births
Living people
Bulgarian men's volleyball players
Olympic volleyball players of Bulgaria
Volleyball players at the 1972 Summer Olympics
Place of birth missing (living people)